The Weapon may refer to:

The Weapon (album), a 1973 album by David Newman
The Weapon (comics), a 2007 comic book mini-series by Fred Van Lante
The Weapon (1956 film), a British thriller film
The Weapon (2023 film), an American action thriller film
The Weapon (game), a play-by-mail game of space-based combat
"The Weapon", a song by Rush from the 1982 album Signals
The Weapon, a 2005 novel by Michael Z. Williamson

See also
Weapon (disambiguation)